Events from the year 1997 in Russia.

Incumbents
President: Boris Yeltsin
Prime Minister: Viktor Chernomyrdin 
Minister of Defence: Igor Rodionov (until 22 May), Igor Sergeyev

Events

March
18 March - Stavropolskaya Aktsionernaya Avia Flight 1023 crashes killing 50 people.

May
8 May - The 1997 Moscow memorandum is signed. 
12 May - The Russia–Chechen Peace Treaty is signed. 
28 May - The Partition Treaty on the Status and Conditions of the Black Sea Fleet is signed

September 
17 September - Russia joins the Paris Club

December
5 December - 1997 Kamchatka earthquake
6 December - 1997 Irkutsk Antonov An-124 crash
14 December - Moscow City Duma election, 1997

Births

January 
4 January - Andrei Mironov, retired defensive midfielder who last played for the Latvian club BFC Daugavpils. 
13 January - Ivan Provorov, ice hockey player for the Philadelphia Flyers
14 January - Tolmachevy Sisters, winners of Junior Eurovision Song Contest 2006
31 January - Anatoliy Ryapolov, long jumper

September 
30 September - Yana Kudryavtseva, rhythmic gymnast

December 
20 December - Lina Fedorova, pair skater

Deaths
7 February - Daniil Shafran, cellist (b. 1923)
21 August - Yuri Nikulin, clown, comedian, circus director, actor. (b. 1921)

References

External links

 
1990s in Russia
Years of the 20th century in Russia
Russia
Russia
Russia